The Virginia–Wise Cavaliers (also UVA Wise Cavaliers), nicknamed the "Highland Cavaliers" before 2017, are the athletic teams that represent the University of Virginia's College at Wise, located in Wise, Virginia, in intercollegiate sports as a member of the NCAA Division II ranks, primarily competing in the South Atlantic Conference (SAC) since the 2019–20 academic year. The Cavaliers previously competed in the D-II Mountain East Conference (MEC) from 2013–14 to 2018–19.

Prior joining the NCAA, UVA Wise previously competed in the Mid-South Conference (MSC) of the National Association of Intercollegiate Athletics (NAIA) from 2010–11 to 2012–13 (with a partial provisional membership as a core member of the D-II Great Midwest Athletic Conference (G-MAC) during their D-II transition within the 2012–13 school year); in the Appalachian Athletic Conference (AAC) from 2001–02 to 2009–10; the Tennessee Valley Athletic Conference from 1994–95 to 2000–01; and in the Kentucky Intercollegiate Athletic Conference (KIAC; now currently known as the River States Conference (RSC) since the 2016–17 school year) from 1971–72 to 1993–94.

Classifications

National affiliations

Conference affiliations

Notes

Varsity teams
UVA Wise competes in 13 intercollegiate varsity sports: Men's sports include baseball, basketball, cross country, football, golf and tennis; while women's sports include basketball, cross country, golf, lacrosse, softball, tennis and volleyball.

History
On April 23, 2012, the college was accepted as a provisional member of the Great Midwest Athletic Conference (G-MAC) and announced it would begin competition as the G-MAC's seventh full member in the 2013–2014 academic year. UVA Wise also announced it planned to submit the NCAA application prior to June 1, 2012. Once accepted by the NCAA, the college will begin the official transition from NAIA to NCAA and if the requirements are met would become an active NCAA Division II member for the 2015–2016 academic year.  However, UVA Wise would play in the G-MAC for only one season; it announced on August 20, 2012, that it would become a charter member of the new Mountain East Conference, a conference made up mostly of former members of the West Virginia Intercollegiate Athletic Conference that ultimately launched in the 2013–14 academic year.

References

External links